Keith Jordan (born November 24, 1950) is an American politician who served in the Tennessee Senate from the 23rd district from 1991 to 1999.

References

1950 births
Living people
Republican Party Tennessee state senators